Sawarda railway station is a station on Konkan Railway. It is at a distance of  down from origin at Roha station. The preceding station on the line is Kamathe railway station and the next station is Aravali railway station.

References

Railway stations along Konkan Railway line
Railway stations in Ratnagiri district
Ratnagiri railway division